Adalbert Toots (12 March 1910 – 25 August 1948) was an Estonian wrestler. He competed in the men's freestyle lightweight at the 1936 Summer Olympics. He was arrested by the NKVD in 1946 and died in a Soviet gulag prison camp in 1948.

References

External links
 

1910 births
1948 deaths
Estonian male sport wrestlers
Olympic wrestlers of Estonia
Wrestlers at the 1936 Summer Olympics
People who died in the Gulag
Estonian people who died in Soviet detention
Sportspeople from Tartu
People from the Governorate of Livonia
20th-century Estonian people